On 4 June 2022, a forest fire broke out in Ali Jan Capri area of Chakesar, a remote area of Shangla District, as a result of which a girl, two children and a woman were burnt to death while collecting firewood.

Some people have also been injured and they have been shifted to Tehsil Headquarters Hospital Chakesar. Rescue operation is still going on.

See also
 2022 Khyber Pakhtunkhwa wildfires
 2022 Haripur wildfire

References

2022 in Pakistan
Shangla District
June 2022 events in Pakistan
Fires in Pakistan
Wildfires in Pakistan
2022 wildfires
2022 meteorology